The Ghana Union Movement is a political party in Ghana. It was founded by Christian Kwabena Andrews who is also the founder of the Life Assembly Worship Center in Accra. During the launch of the party, he declared that he is "new Kwame Nkrumah" and also that the "spirit of Nkrumah is back." The party's agenda received some backing from Samia Nkrumah, daughter of Kwame Nkrumah.

2020 general election
Andrews is one of the presidential candidates for the 2020 Ghanaian general election. He filed his nomination papers on 7 October 2020. On completion of the registration process, his name came third from the top on the ballot paper. Andrew nominated Abu Grant Lukeman as his running mate for the election.

Electoral results

Parliamentary results

Presidential elections

See also
 List of political parties in Ghana

References

2019 establishments in Ghana
Political parties established in 2019
Political parties in Ghana
Social democratic parties in Ghana